Little Cacapon Mountain (  or  ) is a mountain ridge of the Ridge-and-valley Appalachians in Hampshire County, West Virginia, United States. The mountain takes its name from the Little Cacapon River, a Potomac River tributary that lies on its western flanks. It spans from the Frenchburg area, where it is joined by Chestnut Oak Ridge, to the Slanesville Pike where Crooked Run forms a gap between Little Cacapon Mountain and Queens Ridge near Higginsville.

Gallery

References

External links

Ridges of Hampshire County, West Virginia
Ridges of West Virginia